Gzhelskogo kirpichnogo zavoda is a rural locality (a settlement) in Ramensky District of Moscow Oblast, Russia.

References

Rural localities in Moscow Oblast